Katharine Beutner is an American novelist, essayist, and academic. She is the author of Alcestis, winner of the Edmund White Award for debut fiction from the Publishing Triangle in 2011. She was an assistant professor of English at the University of Hawaiʻi at Mānoa. She is currently an assistant professor of English at the College of Wooster.

Personal life
Beutner is bisexual.

Published works

Novels

 Alcestis (Soho Press, 2010)

Journals

Some Little Lamb (an excerpt from the novel Killingly) (TriQuarterly, 2013)

Academic publications

 Remixing the Outline: a Middle-State Moment of Revision. Rough Cuts: Media and Design in Process. Curated by Kari Kraus. Digital collection on MediaCommons’ The New Everyday.
 'The Sole Business of Ladies in Romances': Sharing Histories in Charlotte Lennox’s The Female Quixote. Masters of the Marketplace: British Women Novelists of the 1750s. Ed. Susan Carlile. Bethlehem: Lehigh University Press, May 2011. 165-181.
 Review of A Political Biography of Delarivier Manley, Rachel Carnell. Women’s Writing 17.1 (April 2010): 196-198.

Awards
 Winner, Edmund White Award for Debut Fiction, 2011, from the Publishing Triangle (for Alcestis).
 Finalist, Lesbian Debut Fiction Award, 2011, Lambda Literary Foundation (for Alcestis).
 Finalist, Compton Crook Award, 2011, BSFS (for Alcestis).

References

Living people
Novelists from Pennsylvania
University of Texas alumni
Smith College alumni
College of Wooster faculty
20th-century American novelists
21st-century American novelists
American women novelists
Women science fiction and fantasy writers
20th-century American women writers
21st-century American women writers
Year of birth missing (living people)
Writers from Honolulu
Novelists from Hawaii
American women academics